Three First National Plaza is a 57-story office tower in Chicago located at 70 West Madison Street. The  building was designed by Skidmore, Owings & Merrill in a sawtooth shape to minimize obstructions it might cause to nearby buildings. The design also allows for thirteen corner offices on lower floors and nine corner offices in the upper regions. The exterior façade is clad in Carnelian granite and features  suggestive of traditional Chicago school architecture.

Three First National Plaza's nine-story atrium used to contain "Large Internal-External Upright Form", a sculpture by Henry Moore. The sculpture was removed and sold in 2016 following a remodel of the lobby. The building features pedway access, and was once connected to Chase Tower by a second-story skywalk.

See also
List of skyscrapers
List of tallest buildings in the United States
List of tallest buildings in Chicago
World's tallest structures

Position in Chicago's skyline

References
Emporis listing
Official website of Managing company

External links
Henry Moore Foundation page

Office buildings completed in 1981
Skyscraper office buildings in Chicago
Skidmore, Owings & Merrill buildings
1981 establishments in Illinois